Musalı or Musaly may refer to:
Musalı, Jalilabad, Azerbaijan
Musalı, Saatly, Azerbaijan
Musaly, Salyan, Azerbaijan
Musalı, Mersin, Turkey